Jun Kitagawa   (born July 14, 1973) is a Japanese mixed martial artist. He competed in the Welterweight division.

Mixed martial arts record

|-
| Draw
| align=center| 4-8-2
| Masashi Yozen
| Draw
| Shooto: Gig West 5
| 
| align=center| 2
| align=center| 5:00
| Osaka, Kansai, Japan
| 
|-
| Loss
| align=center| 4-8-1
| Keita Nakamura
| Decision (unanimous)
| Shooto: 6/3 in Kitazawa Town Hall
| 
| align=center| 2
| align=center| 5:00
| Tokyo, Japan
| 
|-
| Draw
| align=center| 4-7-1
| Hirofumi Hara
| Draw
| Shooto 2004: 10/17 in Osaka Prefectural Gymnasium
| 
| align=center| 2
| align=center| 5:00
| Osaka, Kansai, Japan
| 
|-
| Loss
| align=center| 4-7
| Chris Brown
| TKO (cut)
| Shooto Australia: NHB
| 
| align=center| 2
| align=center| 1:31
| Melbourne, Australia
| 
|-
| Win
| align=center| 4-6
| Hirosumi Sugiura
| Decision (unanimous)
| Shooto: Gig West 4
| 
| align=center| 2
| align=center| 5:00
| Osaka, Japan
| 
|-
| Loss
| align=center| 3-6
| Ryuta Sakurai
| TKO (cut)
| Shooto: Gig West 3
| 
| align=center| 1
| align=center| 3:23
| Osaka, Japan
| 
|-
| Loss
| align=center| 3-5
| Shiko Yamashita
| Decision (majority)
| Shooto: Treasure Hunt 5
| 
| align=center| 2
| align=center| 5:00
| Tokyo, Japan
| 
|-
| Win
| align=center| 3-4
| Tomoki Kanuka
| Decision (unanimous)
| Shooto: Gig East 4
| 
| align=center| 2
| align=center| 5:00
| Tokyo, Japan
| 
|-
| Win
| align=center| 2-4
| Masashi Kita
| Decision (unanimous)
| Shooto: Gig West 1
| 
| align=center| 2
| align=center| 5:00
| Osaka, Japan
| 
|-
| Loss
| align=center| 1-4
| John Calvo
| Decision (unanimous)
| Shooto: R.E.A.D. 1
| 
| align=center| 2
| align=center| 5:00
| Tokyo, Japan
| 
|-
| Loss
| align=center| 1-3
| Masaya Inoue
| Decision (unanimous)
| Shooto: Renaxis 5
| 
| align=center| 2
| align=center| 5:00
| Kadoma, Osaka, Japan
| 
|-
| Win
| align=center| 1-2
| Ryuta Sakurai
| Decision (unanimous)
| Shooto: Renaxis 3
| 
| align=center| 2
| align=center| 5:00
| Setagaya, Tokyo, Japan
| 
|-
| Loss
| align=center| 0-2
| Anthony Netzler
| Submission (toe hold)
| Shooto: Las Grandes Viajes 4
| 
| align=center| 1
| align=center| 1:14
| Tokyo, Japan
| 
|-
| Loss
| align=center| 0-1
| Sanae Kikuta
| Submission (achilles lock)
| Lumax Cup: Tournament of J '97 Heavyweight Tournament
| 
| align=center| 1
| align=center| 3:14
| Japan
|

See also
List of male mixed martial artists

References

1973 births
Japanese male mixed martial artists
Welterweight mixed martial artists
Living people